Antimony pentasulfide is an inorganic compound of antimony and sulfur, also known as antimony red. It is a nonstoichiometric compound with a variable composition. Its structure is unknown. Commercial samples are contaminated with sulfur, which may be removed by washing with carbon disulfide in a Soxhlet extractor.

Production
Antimony pentasulfide can be produced by the reaction of antimony with sulfur at a temperature from 250-400 °C in an inert atmosphere.

Uses
It may be used as a red pigment and is one possible precursor to Schlippe's salt, which can be prepared according to the equation:

It is also used in the vulcanization of rubber to produce red rubber.

Physical chemistry
Like many sulfides, this compound liberates hydrogen sulfide upon treatment with strong acids such as hydrochloric acid.

Analysis by Mössbauer spectroscopy indicates that this compound is a derivative antimony(III), explaining the production of antimony(III) chloride, rather than antimony(V) chloride, upon acidification. It is, therefore, not analogous to the phosphorus(V) compound phosphorus pentasulfide.

References

Antitussives
Antimony compounds
Sulfides